Joseph Zhang Yinlin (born April 1971) was a Chinese Catholic priest and the current bishop of Weihui.

Biography
Zhang was born in Linzhou, Henan, in April 1971. He graduated from the National Seminary of Catholic Church in China in 1996. He was ordained a priest in 2004.

In 2011 he was elected deputy director of the Henan Catholic Academic Affairs Committee. In 2013 he was elected a member of the 12th Henan People's Political Consultative Conference of the Chinese People's Political Consultative Conference.  

On April 29, 2015, he was elected Coadjutor Bishop of Anyang, which was recognized by the Pope. On May 8, 2016, he became bishop of Weihui.

References

1971 births
Living people
21st-century Roman Catholic bishops in China
National Seminary of Catholic Church in China alumni
People from Anyang